A consultant is a professional who provides advice in a particular area of expertise.

Consultant may also refer to:

Entertainment
 The Consultant (film), a short film
 The Consultant (TV series), 2023 television series
 "The Consultant" (M*A*S*H), an episode of the television series M*A*S*H
 "The Consultant" (Fringe), an episode of the television series Fringe
 The Consultants, a comedy sketch team
 The Consultant, a character of the music group Cardiacs

Other uses
Consultant (medicine), the title of a senior hospital-based physician or surgeon in some areas
Consultation (Texas), the 1835 Texas meeting of colonists on a proposed rebellion against the Republic of Mexico
 Psychotherapy, mental health practice of counseling

See also
 List of counseling topics
 Counselor (disambiguation), designation for practitioners in certain professions
 Consultation (disambiguation)